Darren G. Jackson (born June 29, 1970) is an American attorney and politician, who currently serves as a judge of the North Carolina Court of Appeals.

Jackson served as a Democratic member of the North Carolina House of Representatives from 2009 through 2020, representing part of Wake County, North Carolina. While in the legislature, Jackson was also an attorney with Gay, Jackson & McNally, LLP.

Jackson was elected House Minority (Democratic) Leader just before the beginning of the 2017-18 session of the North Carolina General Assembly. He announced that he would not seek another term as minority leader after the 2020 legislative elections.

On Dec. 30, 2020, Jackson resigned from the House of Representatives to accept an appointment from North Carolina Governor Roy Cooper to serve on the North Carolina Court of Appeals. He filled the vacancy created by Judge Phil Berger Jr.'s election to the state supreme court.  He sought election to a full term in 2022, but was defeated.

Electoral history

2020

2018

2016

2014

2012

2010

2004

2002

References

External links
 
NC Judicial Branch official biography

|-

|-

1970 births
Living people
People from Wake County, North Carolina
University of North Carolina at Chapel Hill alumni
Duke University School of Law alumni
North Carolina lawyers
21st-century American politicians
Democratic Party members of the North Carolina House of Representatives
North Carolina Court of Appeals judges